Dinara Safina was the defending champion, but she lost against Klára Zakopalová in the first round.

Aravane Rezaï won in the final 6–2, 7–5 against  Venus Williams.

Seeds

Bye 
The four Rome semifinalists received a bye into the second round. They are as follows:
  Serena Williams (third round)
  Jelena Janković (quarterfinals)
  Ana Ivanovic (second round)
  María José Martínez Sánchez (second round)

Draw

Finals

Top half

Section 1

Section 2

Bottom half

Section 3

Section 4

References
Main Draw
Qualifying Draw

Women's Singles